Edward Glover may refer to:
 Edward Glover (athlete) (1885–1940), American pole vaulter
 Edward Glover (psychoanalyst) (1888–1972), British psychoanalyst
 Edward Glover (politician) (died 1862), Irish Independent Conservative politician and barrister
 Edward Lee Glover (born 1970), Scottish former footballer
Ed Glover (politician), state legislator in Arkansas
 Ned Glover, Emmerdale character